This page is a List of people related to Quranic verses:

Ahl al-Bayt
The Ahl al-Bayt was Muhammad's household. Shi'a and Sunni have differing views regarding who is included among them, and also different views regarding which verses are associated with the household. Sunni considers Muhammad's wives, Children of Muhammad and uncles of Muhammad and their children are the Ahl al Bayt.

Generally

3:61

{{bq|And whoso disputeth with thee concerning him, after the knowledge which hath come unto thee, say (unto him): Come! We will summon our sons and your sons, and our women and your women, and ourselves and yourselves, then we will pray humbly (to our Lord) and (solemnly) invoke the curse of Allah upon those who lie.|}}

According to hadith collections, in 631 an Arab Christian envoy from Najran (currently in northern Yemen and partly in Saudi Arabia) came to Muhammad to argue which of the two parties erred in its doctrine concerning Jesus. After likening Jesus' miraculous birth to Adam's creation, Muhammad called them to mubahala (cursing), where each party should ask God to destroy the lying party and their families. Muhammad, to prove to them that he is a prophet, brought his daughter Fatimah and his surviving grandchildren, Hasan ibn Ali and Husayn ibn Ali, and Ali ibn Abi Talib and came back to the Christians and said this is my family and covered himself and his family with a cloak. Allameh Tabatabaei explains in Tafsir al-Mizan that the word "Our selves" in this verse refers to Muhammad and Ali. Then he narrates Imam Ali al-Rida, eighth Shia Imam, in discussion with Al-Ma'mun, Abbasid caliph, referred to this verse to prove the superiority of Muhammad's progeny over the rest of the Muslim community, and considered it as the proof for Ali's right for caliphate due to Allah made Ali like the self of Muhammad.

33:33

Surah Al-Ahzaab, Ayah 33:
"...Verily, Allah has decreed to remove fault from you, O' Ahlul Bayt, and sanctify you in a perfect way."

Surah Al-Ahzaab, Full Ayah 33:

"Stay in your houses and do not display your finery with the display of the former [days of] ignorance. Maintain the prayer and pay the zakat and obey Allah and His Apostle. Verily, Allah has decreed to remove fault from you, O' Ahlul Bayt, and sanctify you in a perfect way."

Each Ayah is an individual sign of Allah:
"Ayah or Aayah is the Arabic word for evidence or sign:

"These are the Ayat (proofs, evidences, verses, lessons, revelations, etc.) of Allah, which We recite to you (O Muhammad) with truth. Then in which speech after Allah and His Ayat will they believe?" (Surah Al-Jathiya 45:6)

Secondly, this Ayah uses the words Ankum (from you) and Yutahhirakum (to purify you), which are both in the masculine plural form. Though it is known that in Arabic Masculine is unisex, there is a problem saying that since the fact that the previous sentence in reference to the wives used only feminine verbs and pronouns, while this sentences uses masculine. The feminine for the above would be Ankunna and Yutahhirakunna. The sudden change in grammatical gender reference means that it is not about the wives. Similar use of switching subjects after Ayahs are found all throughout the Quran. A great example of this is Surah Haqqah, which does so in nearly every Ayah.

Muhammad explicitly called few of his wives Aisha, Maria al-Qibtiyya and Umm Salama are also his Ahl al Bayt.

When Zayd ibn Arqam was older, he retold the hadith of the two weighty things, during the rule of the Umayyad Caliphate. One version is quoted in Sahih Muslim where he, after being asked several times, tells about the event and unwillingly concludes that Muhammad's wives are not part of the Ahl ul-Bayt. In another version, he gives a more vague answer.

Sahih Muslim #31:5920-2:
"Hussain Ibn Sabrah asked Zaid Ibn Arqam, "Who are the members of His household? Aren't His wives part of the members of his family?" Thereupon Zaid said, "His wives are members of his family [in a general sense], but (Islamically), the members of his family are those for whom acceptance of zakat is forbidden." Hussain asked, "Who are they?". Upon which Zaid said, "Ali and the offspring of Ali, Aqil and the offspring of Aqil, the offspring of Jaffer, and the offspring of Abbas." Hussain said "These are those for whom the acceptance of zakat is forbidden?" Zaid replied, "Yes."

In another version, he gives a more vague answer.

Hussain Then asked: "Aren't the wives (Of the Prophet) included amongst the members of the household?" He said, "No, by Allah, a woman lives with a man [as his wife] for a certain period; he then divorces her, and she goes back to her parents and her people. The members of his household include his own self, and his kith, and kin, for whom the acceptance of zakat is prohibited."
- Sahih Muslim #31:5923

Ali ibn Abi Talib

Before Shia & Sunni Ali is the one of Alh al-Bayt.
Ali is the fourth Sunni Caliph and first Shia Imam.

2.207

In 622, the year of Muhammad's migration to Yathrib (now Medina), Ali risked his life by sleeping in Muhammad's bed to impersonate him and thwart an assassination plot, so that Muhammad could escape in safety. This night is called Laylat al-mabit. According to some hadith, a verse was revealed about Ali concerning his sacrifice on the night of Hijra which says, "

5.3

According to Sunni Tafsir this verse was delivered in Farewell Pilgrimage while according to Shia ones it refers to appointment of Ali ibn Abi Talib as the successor of Muhammad in pond of Khumm which happened while Muslims returned from Mecca to Medina, few days later.

5.55

It is unanimous among only Shia that this verse refers to Ali ibn Abi Talib and was revealed after he had given his ring away to someone in need who had entered the mosque while prayer was in progress.Tafsir al-Kashaf, Al-Zamakhshari, p.505, 649Tafsir al-Kabir, Ibn Jarir al-Tabari, p.186, 288-289Tafsir al-Khazin, p.68

13.7

Some Shia sources claim that when this verse was revealed when Mohammad said "I'm the warner and the guide and through you will be guided those who are to be guided."

Muhammad's wives

Khadija

Khadija was Muhammad's first wife. She was a businesswoman and Muhammad was her employee. Muhammad did not marry a second wife until after she died, an event which Muhammad greatly mourned. Muhammad was 50 years old when Khadija died.

Hafsa

These Ayahs are talking to Hafsa and Aisha, two of Muhammad's wives who disclose secret of Muhammad .

Surah at-Tahrim, Ayahs 3-5:

3"And when the Prophet (blessings and peace be upon him) secretly disclosed a matter to one of his wives, but when she mentioned it and Allah made it known to the Prophet (blessings and peace be upon him), then the Prophet reminded her of some part of it and overlooked (to inform) the rest of it. Then when the Prophet (blessings and peace be upon him) informed her of it (that she had disclosed that secret), she said: ‘Who has told you of that?’ The Prophet (blessings and peace be upon him) said: ‘The All-Knowing, All-Aware (Lord) has told me.’
.
4. If you both turn to Allah in repentance, (that is better for you) because the hearts of both of you have inclined (towards the same), but if you help one another in this matter (that may annoy the Holy Prophet [blessings and peace be upon him]). So surely Allah is the One Who is his Friend and Helper and Jibril (Gabriel) and the most pious believers and after them (all) angels too are (his) helpers.

 If he divorces you, then it may well be that your Lord will give him in your place better wives than yourselves (who) will be obedient, true believers, submissive, penitent, worshippers, given to fasting, (some) formerly married and (some) virgins."

Zaynab bint Jahsh

Zaynab was married to Zayd ibn Harithah until they divorced and she married Muhammad.

33:36is not fitting for a Believer, man or woman, when a matter has been decided by Allah and His Messenger to have any option about their decision: if any one disobeys Allah and His Messenger, he is indeed on a clearly wrong Path.Sawda bint ZamaAnd they ask you a decision about women. Say: God makes known to you His decision concerning them, and that which is recited to you in the Book concerning female orphans whom you do not give what is appointed for them while you desire to marry them, and concerning the weak among children, and that you should deal towards orphans with equity; and whatever good you do, God surely knows it.Clans

Banu Abd-al-Manaf
A sub-clan of the Quraish tribe.

Generally

102.1-2"Engage (your) vying in exuberance, until ye come to the graves.".

A'as ibn Wa'il
A'as ibn Wa'il is the father of Amr ibn al-A'as.

108
Entire chapter

Banu Sahm
A sub-clan of the Quraish tribe.

Generally

102.1-2"Engage (your) vying in exuberance, until ye come to the graves.".

Banu Makhzum
A sub-clan of the Quraish tribe.

Walid ibn al-Mughira"Heed not the type of despicable men,- ready with oaths, A slanderer, going about with calumnies, (Habitually) hindering (all) good, transgressing beyond bounds, deep in sin, Violent (and cruel), with all that, base-born.".

Banu Zuhrah
A sub-clan of the Quraish tribe.

Sa'd ibn Abi-Waqqas"And We have enjoined man in respect of his parents-- his mother bears him with faintings upon faintings and his weaning takes two years-- saying: Be grateful to Me and to both your parents; to Me is the eventual coming. And if they contend with you that you should associate with Me what you have no knowledge of, do not obey them, and keep company with them in this world kindly, and follow the way of him who turns to Me, then to Me is your return, then will I inform you of what you did--"Banu Hashim
The Banu Hashim was Muhammads own clan

Generally

26.214"come out openly and warn the people of your own clan."Abu Lahab
Abu Lahab was an enemy of Muhammad, and the brother of Muhammad's father. His name means "father of fire" and is one of the three  Meccan personal names mentioned in the Quran.(Other two names are Muhammad himself and his friend Zaid)

111.1-5Perish the two hands of Abû Lahab, and perish he!His wealth and his children (etc.) will not benefit him!He will be burnt in a Fire of blazing flames!And his wife too, who carries wood (thorns of Sadan which she used to put on the way of the Prophet or use to slander him).In her neck is a rope of Masad (fire).Unclassified clan

Akhnas ibn Shariq

Entire chapter.

An incident occurred prior to these verses being revealed. A man named Al-Akhnas ibn Shuriq came to Muhammad to embrace Islam, but as he turned to leave, he happened to pass by a pasture and grazing animals. He set it alight and killed the cattle. This verses express disapproval.

Uqbah ibn Abu Mu'ayt

One sources claims this verse is regarding Uqbah ibn Mu'ayt and Ubay ibn Khalaf.

Ubay ibn Khalaf

One sources claims this verse is regarding Uqbah ibn Mu'ayt and Ubay ibn Khalaf.

One sources stats he was ransomed from after Badr, but was killed by Muhammad himself with a spear in the Battle of Uhud (625 CE). Verse  was revealed in this occasion.

Sahaba
Prophet Muhammad's companions.

Zayd ibn Harithah
Zayd was Muhammad's adopted son. He is the only companion of Muhammad whose name appears in the Quran.And when you said to him to whom Allah had shown favor and to whom you had shown a favor: Keep your wife to yourself and be careful of (your duty to) Allah; and you concealed in your soul what Allah would bring to light, and you feared men, and Allah had a greater right that you should fear Him. But when Zaid had accomplished his want of her, We gave her to you as a wife, so that there should be no difficulty for the believers in respect of the wives of their adopted sons, when they have accomplished their want of them; and Allah's command shall be performed.Salman the Persian
Salman was a companion of Muhammad, highly respected by both Shi'a and SunniAnd He (Allah) has sent him (Muhammad) also to other (Muslims).''

Notes

Works cited
 

 
Quran-related lists
Quranic verses